The women's 1000 metres at the 1999 Asian Winter Games was held on 5 February 1999 in Chuncheon, South Korea.

Schedule
All times are Korea Standard Time (UTC+09:00)

Records

Results
Legend
DNS — Did not start

References
Results
Results

External links
Official website

Women 1000